Borja García Santamaría (born 7 January 1990) is a Spanish footballer who plays as a defender for UE Cornellà.

Football career
García was born in Laredo, Cantabria. He graduated from Racing de Santander's youth ranks, and made his senior debuts with the reserves in the 2009–10 campaign in Segunda División B.

García made his first team - and La Liga - debut on 27 August 2011, playing the last 21 minutes in a 3–4 away defeat against Valencia CF. He continued to appear regularly with the B-side, however, and was released in 2013.

In October 2013 García joined Tercera División side SCR Peña Deportiva. On 24 January of the following year he moved to Ontinyent CF in the third level.

On 5 August 2014 García moved to Real Avilés, also in the third division. He remained in the category in the following years, representing UD Logroñés (two stints), Lorca FC, Extremadura UD and Recreativo de Huelva.

References

External links

1990 births
Living people
People from Laredo, Cantabria
Spanish footballers
Footballers from Cantabria
Association football defenders
La Liga players
Segunda División players
Segunda División B players
Tercera División players
Rayo Cantabria players
Racing de Santander players
SCR Peña Deportiva players
Ontinyent CF players
Real Avilés CF footballers
UD Logroñés players
Lorca FC players
Extremadura UD footballers
Recreativo de Huelva players
UE Cornellà players
Spain youth international footballers